The Macedonian literary circle (1938–1941) was a literary society created in Sofia, Bulgaria in 1938 by young and educated members of the Macedonian immigrant community, who were Bulgarian communists. After the resolution of the Comintern on the Macedonian Question published in 1934, the Bulgarian Communist Party adopted its thesis and tried to urge some intellectuals to work out a plan for the creation of a distinct Macedonian language and for development of new Macedonian literature. With the foundation of this society, an attempt was made, to use it in order to do both. Though, its by-laws and statutes were in Bulgarian. Most active from its members were: Nikola Vaptsarov, Venko Markovski, Kole Nedelkovski, Vasil Ivanovski, Gjorgji Abadžiev, Anton Popov, Mihail Smatrakalev, Dimitar Mitrev and others. However, the circle disbanded itself as useless in the spring of 1941, when most of Macedonia came under Bulgarian administration, and a euphoria overwhelmed its participants, seeing in it a form of national unification.

See also
Macedonian Scientific and Literary Society
Young Macedonian Literary Society

References

History of North Macedonia
History of Bulgaria
1938 establishments in Bulgaria
Communism in Bulgaria
Macedonian writers' organizations